Charles Latham, 1st Baron Latham (1888–1970) was a British politician and Leader of the London County Council from 1940 to 1947.

Early life and career
Latham was born with the surname Lathan in Norwich, and changed his name in order to distinguish himself from his elder brother, who also had a political career. He worked as a Railway Clerk there, and later moved to London where he became involved in Trade Union activities. He helped to form the London Labour Party in 1914, and was President of the National Union of Clerks in 1916. During World War I he fought in France with the Royal Sussex Regiment.

Elected office
Latham had retrained as an accountant and continued his involvement in London politics, fighting the general elections of 1922 and 1923 in Hendon. His administrative skill and knowledge of transport issues led to his selection as a County Alderman on the London County Council in 1928. This brought him into close contact with Herbert Morrison, the Labour Leader on the LCC and Minister of Transport in the Labour government from 1929. Latham was a strong personal supporter of Morrison with whom he agreed on most issues (especially financial orthodoxy), and with Morrison's support he was elected again to the London Executive.

In the 1934 election Latham gave up his seat as an Alderman for an elected Councillor at Hackney South, again using Morrison's influence (Morrison had been Mayor and MP for Hackney). Labour won a majority and Latham was appointed as Chair of the Finance Committee, which both Morrison and Latham agreed should make sure that taxation was kept as low as possible. This work was seen to be successful when Labour were re-elected in 1937.

On 16 January 1942 he was created Baron Latham, of Hendon in the County of Middlesex.

When Morrison was appointed to the Government in the wartime Coalition, he chose Latham as his successor as leader of the council. The circumstances of the time made civil defence of London the top priority for the council, and normal party politics were suspended. The council had a large share of the responsibility for Air Raid Precautions (it ran the Fire Service and the Ambulance Service) and it was the biggest hospital authority in the country. Latham took the chairmanship of the Civil Defence Committee for himself.

However, Latham did not ignore political issues during the war. He instigated a Labour Party inquiry into the structure of London government for the post-war period, which was an attempt to settle and justify his preferred policy of creating a Greater London Authority covering a much wider area. This was a highly controversial policy within the party, and two members of the committee drawing up the report voted against it, with four others unable to agree on the distribution of powers between various local government bodies.

After the end of the war Latham won the 1946 election in a landslide, following other large Labour victories at the General election and in municipal elections. However his relationship with the Labour group deteriorated with many complaints about lack of consultation and excessive discipline. Although this was characteristic of all Labour leaders of the LCC, Latham did not have the personality or the stature to overcome it. On 15 July 1947, Latham announced his resignation 'for personal reasons'. It is often held to be significant that his successor, Isaac Hayward, was one of those who had voted against his plan for a Greater London Authority, and Hayward's Chief Whip was the other.

He appears in the film The Proud City discussing the Abercrombie plans for the redevelopment of London after the war.

London Transport Executive
Latham had served on the London Passenger Transport Board (LPTB) since 1935, and, within a month of his resignation as Leader of the LCC, his appointment as chairman of the London Transport Executive (LTE), which was to replace the LPTB from 1 January 1948, was announced by the Labour Government on 20 August 1947. Latham's appointment had been predicted in a House of Commons debate on the Transport Act on 24 July by MP Henry Strauss, and the coincidence of these two events provoked considerable comment and suggestions of a fix, but the Minister for Transport denied that he had had any contact with Latham.

Lord Ashfield, chairman of the outgoing LPTB, resigned the post on 31 October 1947, and Latham filled the role temporarily until the Board was abolished at the end of that year. As chairman of the LTE, Latham welcomed in London's last tram in the early hours of 6 July 1952. Latham served as Chairman for six years.

Later career
He was made a peer from 1942 (when he was LCC Leader) and held public appointments later on the Metropolitan Water Board and the Standing Advisory Committee on Pay of the Higher Civil Service. He was Lord Lieutenant of Middlesex from 1945 to 1956.

He died in London in 1970, at the age of 81. His usual address was given as in Montagu Square, Marylebone.

Personal life
Charles Latham was married twice.

Firstly, to Maya Helen Allman, daughter of Louis George Allman, on 14 June 1913. They were later divorced.
They had four children:
 Francis Charles Allman Latham b. 24 Jan 1917, d. Nov 1959
 Barbara Wendy Latham b. 7 Jan 1920
 Jean Helen Latham b. 17 Jul 1921
 Diana Dorothy Latham b. 18 Sep 1925.

On 28 March 1957 he married Sylvia May Kennard (died 1985), daughter of Alexander Newmark, of London, and widow of Alexander Kennard.

Arms

References

External links

1888 births
1970 deaths
British Army personnel of World War I
Royal Sussex Regiment soldiers
Military personnel from Norwich
Labour Party (UK) councillors
Lord-Lieutenants of Middlesex
Members of London County Council
People associated with transport in London
Labour Party (UK) hereditary peers
Leaders of local authorities of England
Barons created by George VI